Albarracín is a Spanish surname. Notable people with the surname include:

Eric Albarracin (born c. 1983), American wrestler
Ernesto Albarracín, Argentine footballer
Francisco Albarracín (born 1985), Argentine rugby union player
Justo Albarracín (born 1951), Argentine equestrian
Miguel Albarracín (born 1981), Argentine judoka
Paulo Albarracín (born 1989), Peruvian footballer
Pilar Albarracín (born 1968), Spanish artist
Severino Albarracín (1851–1878), Spanish anarchist
Tobías Albarracín (born 1984), Argentine footballer
 Jose Albarracín (born 1988), Reliability Engineer 

Spanish-language surnames